Aṅgula (from   - 'a finger; the thumb; a finger's breadth') is a measure of length.  Twelve aṅgulas make a Vitasti or span, and twenty-four a Hasta or Cubit. 108 Angulam make a 'Dhanusha'. These measurements are claimed to have been used since the Harappan civilization and that these were also used for the construction of Taj Mahal. 

One Aṅgula during the Maurya period is believed to be approximately equal to 1.763 centimetres.  

In the Hindu , the size of an aṅgula is considerably larger "the length of the middle digit [phalange] of the middle finger", (about 4.5 cm), but the ratios with the larger units remain unchanged.

Notes

Units of length
Customary units in India
Obsolete units of measurement